Milorad Dabić (born 1 May 1991) is a Serbian football forward who last played for 1. HFK Olomouc.

Career
Born in Belgrade, Dabić started his career playing for Zlatibor Čajetina. After two years with Zeta, he stayed with Sopot for a year. Next he played for Hajduk Beograd until the end of 2013–14. After season with Žarkovo which he ended with 25 matches and 7 goals, he joined Serbian SuperLiga club Rad in summer 2015.

Career statistics

References

External links
 
 Milorad Dabić stats at utakmica.rs
 
 Player profile

1991 births
Living people
Footballers from Belgrade
Association football forwards
Serbian footballers
FK Sopot players
FK Hajduk Beograd players
OFK Žarkovo players
FK Rad players
FK Zeta players
Montenegrin First League players
Serbian SuperLiga players